Corva may refer to:
 Corva, Arizona, a populated place in the US
 Corva, a frazione in Azzano Decimo, north-eastern Italy
 Corva, a frazione in Porto Sant'Elpidio, central Italy
 Corva (grape), an Italian grape variety

See also
Giardino Botanico Alpino di Pietra Corva, a botanical garden in northern Italy
Corvidae, the family of birds known as corvids
Curva